Heather Tully (born February 6, 1980) is an American politician and nurse serving as a member of the West Virginia House of Delegates from the 41st district. She was appointed by Governor Jim Justice on June 17, 2020.

Early life and education 
Tully was born in Olean, New York and raised in St. Albans, West Virginia, where she attended Saint Albans High School. She earned a Bachelor of Science in Nursing from the University of Charleston, a certificate in medical coding and billing from New River Community and Technical College, and a Master of Science in Nursing from West Virginia University.

Career 
After graduating from college, Tully worked as a critical care and ICU nurse. Since earning her master's degree, she has worked as a family nurse practitioner. She is a member of the West Virginia Nurses Association. Tully was appointed to the West Virginia House of Delegates in June 2020, succeeding Jordan Hill.

References 

1980 births
Living people
Republican Party members of the West Virginia House of Delegates
People from St. Albans, West Virginia
People from Olean, New York
Women state legislators in West Virginia